Parliamentary elections were held in Albania on 3 July 2005. The result was a victory for the opposition Democratic Party (PD) and its allies, prominently the Republican Party (PR). Former president Sali Berisha became prime minister as a result of the election.

Electoral system
The 140 members of parliament were elected using the mixed-member proportional representation. Voters elected 100 deputies directly from constituencies and 40 from party lists.

Conduct
The proper conduct of the election was seen as crucial in maintaining Albania's eventual EU hopes. For the most part, election day was peaceful, but OSCE monitors said that the poll only partially complied with international standards, citing disorganization, improper procedures and "a few violent incidents." The Central Election Commission (CEC) received over 300 complaints.

Monitors from the Organization for Security and Co-operation in Europe called the election a “disappointment,” saying it failed to comply with international standards because of “serious irregularities,” intimidation, vote-buying and “violence committed by extremists on both sides.”

Results
On 14 July the CEC released final results for 97 constituencies as well as the tentative national proportional results. The clear winners were the Democratic Party and its allies, though with many close constituency races between the PD and the governing Socialist Party of Albania (PSSh). The only party to win both proportional and constituency-level seats was the Socialist Movement for Integration (LSI) of former prime minister Ilir Meta, as Meta himself won the party's lone constituency mandate. Despite this, the LSI did not fulfill pre-election expectations that it might emerge as a dealmaker in the next parliament.

References

External links
Angus Reid Consultants - Election Tracker
Albanian Central Election Commission

Parliamentary elections in Albania
Albania
Parliamentary election
Albania